Carol Jane Thatcher (born 15 August 1953) is an English journalist, author and media personality. She is the daughter of Margaret Thatcher, the British prime minister from 1979 to 1990, and Denis Thatcher.

She has written biographies of both her parents and also produced a documentary about her father which contained his only public interview. She won the fifth series of the reality show I'm a Celebrity...Get Me Out of Here!

Early life
Thatcher was born at Queen Charlotte's and Chelsea Hospital in Hammersmith, London, on 15 August 1953. She and her twin brother, Mark, were born six weeks prematurely by C-section. According to Margaret Thatcher, her husband Denis Thatcher responded to seeing their children for the first time by saying, "My God, they look like rabbits. Put them back." Thatcher's mother was selected for the constituency of Finchley in north London in 1958 and was elected as a Member of Parliament in 1959.

In 1960, Thatcher was sent to Queenswood School, a girls' boarding school near Hatfield, Hertfordshire, before attending St Paul's Girls' School. She graduated with a law degree from University College London, before moving to Australia in 1977 to begin a journalism career. While she was there, her mother was elected prime minister. Thatcher later said, "You need quite good shock absorbers and a sense of humour to be the prime minister's child."

Journalism career

Thatcher began her career as a journalist in Australia, working on the Sydney Morning Herald from 1977 to 1979. She became a TV reporter at Channel Seven, also in Sydney, and later a reporter on its news morning show, 11AM. On her return to Britain, she worked as a presenter for LBC, BBC Radio 4, TV-am and wrote travel articles for The Daily Telegraph. Due to her mother's high-profile political position, many newspapers refused to publish work with her byline.

Her first book, Diary of an Election: with Margaret Thatcher on the campaign trail, was published in 1983. Her second book, a collaboration with tennis player Chris Evert Lloyd called Lloyd on Lloyd, was released three years later. It became Thatcher's first best-seller.

Later publications included a 1996 best-selling biography of her father, Below the Parapet. In 2003, Thatcher produced a Channel 4 documentary about him called Married to Maggie. Thatcher captured the only public interview Denis Thatcher ever gave; he died shortly after its release. Thatcher's freelance career has included contributing articles to magazines and papers as well as television work.

Reality shows

I'm a Celebrity...Get Me Out of Here!

In November 2005 Thatcher was selected to appear with a number of fellow celebrities on the ITV television show I'm a Celebrity...Get Me Out of Here! The format of the show meant that she would be forced to spend at least a week in the Australian rainforest with a minimal supply of food in basic living conditions.

She had to undergo one of the more infamous "Bushtucker Trials" during her stay in the jungle – which saw her eat jungle bugs and kangaroo testicles as a challenge to earn food for her fellow celebrities. Ultimately, she emerged as the fifth series winner and second 'Queen of the Jungle'.

Most Haunted
Thatcher appeared on Living TV's Most Haunted on 13 February 2007 as a celebrity guest alongside presenter Yvette Fielding

Mummy's War
In 2007, Carol Thatcher travelled to the Falkland Islands and Argentina for the documentary Mummy's War, in order to explore the legacy of the Falklands War.

The One Show
From 2006 to 2009, Thatcher was a freelance contributor to the BBC One magazine programme The One Show, making filmed reports and joining the presenters and guests in the studio for discussions.

On 3 February 2009, British media reported that during the 2009 Australian Open Thatcher had, in a conversation in the show's green room, referred to a black tennis player, reportedly Jo-Wilfried Tsonga, as a golliwog. According to The Times, Thatcher called Tsonga "half-golliwog" and "the golliwog Frog". Presenter Adrian Chiles, comedian Jo Brand, journalists and several guests were with Thatcher when she made the remark. The BBC stated that Thatcher would not work again on The One Show unless she made a more sincere apology. Thatcher refused, saying "I stand by what I said. I wasn't going to apologise. I never meant it in a racist way. It was shorthand. I described someone's appearance colloquially—someone I happen to greatly admire."

Bibliography

Personal life
Thatcher had a relationship with Jonathan Aitken, which ended in 1979. As this happened just after the Conservatives won the general election, Aitken's breaking up with Thatcher is alleged to have been the reason for his being bypassed for a ministerial career; Thatcher's mother, the Prime Minister at the time, reportedly told cabinet colleagues that she was "damned" if she was going to give a job to a man "who had made Carol cry".

Thatcher lives with ski instructor Marco Grass in Klosters-Serneus, Switzerland.

References

External links

 Biography of Carol Thatcher Unreality TV (Archived)

1953 births
Living people
Alumni of University College London
British biographers
British diarists
British expatriates in Switzerland
Children of prime ministers of the United Kingdom
Children of national leaders
Daughters of baronets
Daughters of life peers
English journalists
English television personalities
Fraternal twins
I'm a Celebrity...Get Me Out of Here! (British TV series) winners
Margaret Thatcher
People educated at Queenswood School
People educated at St Paul's Girls' School
People from Hammersmith
English twins
The Sydney Morning Herald people